Xfinity may refer to:

Xfinity, a brand of Comcast Corporation used to market various products, including:
Xfinity Flex, an internet television service
Xfinity Streampix, an online on demand media streaming service
Xfinity 3D, 3D version of Xfinity
NASCAR Xfinity Series, a stock car racing series in the United States
Xfinity Center (disambiguation), any of several venues in the United States
Xfinity Theatre, an outdoor/indoor amphitheatre in Hartford, Connecticut